The 4R01 was a 4-speed automatic transmission from Nissan's Jatco subsidiary for rear wheel drive vehicles with longitudinal engines.

Versions

RL4R01A

The RL4R01A is a hydraulic controlled unit for its main operation. Shift timing is based on throttle cable position and governor pressure. Its only electronic parts are two solenoids, one for the torque converter clutch, and the other for the manual overdrive cancel switch, but these do not affect the gears control and passing.

It is also called JR402 by Jatco.

RE4R01A

The RE4R01A (or Jatco JR402E ) is a fully electronic controlled unit.

It is also called JR402E by Jatco and R4A-EL by Mazda.

Despite the internals are mostly the same, valve bodies, cases and housings have some divergences with the RL4R01A.

RE4R01B

The RE4R01B is a RE4R01A with some little changes, like the valve body, filter, some solenoids and the band.

Like the RE4R01A, it is also called JR402E by Jatco.

Specifications

Main design
For its four forward gear ratios and reverse, the 4R01 uses five clutch, one band and two one-way clutch.

Strength
There are some versions stronger than others. These can be either RL4R01A or RE4R01A. The differences between these versions are the number of discs of the High clutch (4 to 5) and Forward clutch (5 to 8).

Gear ratios

Applications
 RL4R01A
 1998–2004 Nissan Frontier (D22)
 1998–2004 KA24DE (Type A).
 1990–1997 Nissan Hardbody Truck (D21)
 1990–1997 KA24E (Type A).
 1990–1995 Nissan Pathfinder (WD21)
 1990–1995 KA24E (Type A).
 RE4R01A
 1992–1997 Infiniti J30
 1990–1992 Infiniti M30
 1997–2003 Infiniti QX4
 1992–1995 Mazda 929
 1989–1999 Mazda MPV
 1990–1993 Mazda Pickup
 1993–1996 Mazda RX-7
 1989–1994 Nissan 240SX (S13)
 1989–1990 KA24E (Type A).
 1991–1994 KA24DE (Type A).
 1995–1998 Nissan 240SX (S14)
 1995–1998 KA24DE (Type A).
 1990–1997 Nissan 300ZX Non-Turbo
 1999–2004 Nissan Frontier (D22)
 1999–2004 VG33E (Type A).
 2001–2004 VG33ER (Type A).
 1987–1999 Nissan Gloria
 1990–1997 Nissan Hardbody Truck (D21)
 1990–1995 VG30E 2WD (Type A).
 1990–1995 VG30E 4WD (Type B).
 1990–1995 Nissan Pathfinder (WD21)
 1990–1995 VG30E 2WD (Type A).
 1990–1995 VG30E 4WD (Type B).
 1996–2004 Nissan Pathfinder (R50)
 1996–2000 VG33E (Type A).
 2001–2004 VQ35DE (Type A).
 1996–1998 Nissan Skyline R33 GTS turbo
 1996–2001 Nissan Stagea
 2000–2004 Nissan Xterra
 –1989 Nissan Van
 RE4R01B
 1992–2004 Nissan Skyline

References
RL4R01A ATSG manual, April 2004 edition
RE4R01A ATSG manual, March 2003 edition
Nissan Pathfinder (WD21) 1994 FSM
Nissan Frontier (D22) 1999 FSM
Nissan Hardbody Truck (D21) 1995 FSM
Nissan 240SX (S13) 1991 FSM

See also
List of Jatco transmissions
Jaguar Car Parts

4R01